is a passenger railway station in the city of Naka, Ibaraki, Japan operated by East Japan Railway Company (JR East).

Lines
Hitachi-Kōnosu Station is served by the Suigun Line, and is located 13.4 rail kilometers from the official starting point of the line at Mito Station.

Station layout
The station consists of a single side platform serving traffic in both directions. The station is unattended.

History
Hitachi-Kōnosu Station opened on June 12, 1918 as a station on the Mito Railway which was nationalized on December 1, 1927. The station was absorbed into the JR East network upon the privatization of the Japanese National Railways (JNR) on April 1, 1987.

Surrounding area
Kiuchi Brewing Company

See also
List of railway stations in Japan

External links

  JR East Station information 

Railway stations in Ibaraki Prefecture
Suigun Line
Railway stations in Japan opened in 1918
Naka, Ibaraki